Lincolnton–Lincoln County Regional Airport  is a public use airport located five nautical miles (9 km) east of the central business district of Lincolnton, a city in Lincoln County, North Carolina, United States. It is owned by the City of Lincolnton & Lincoln County. According to the FAA's National Plan of Integrated Airport Systems for 2009–2013, it is a general aviation airport (it had previously been a reliever airport).

Although many U.S. airports use the same three-letter location identifier for the FAA and IATA, this airport is assigned IPJ by the FAA but has no designation from the IATA.

Facilities and aircraft 
It has one runway designated 5/23 with an asphalt surface measuring 5,500 by 100 feet (1,676 x 30 m).

For the 12-month period ending June 6, 2008, the airport had 34,100 aircraft operations, an average of 93 per day: 97% general aviation and 3% military. At that time there were 71 aircraft based at this airport: 87% single-engine, 10% multi-engine and 3% helicopter.

References

External links 
  at North Carolina DOT airport guide
 Aerial photo as of April 1998 from USGS The National Map
 

Airports in North Carolina
Transportation in Lincoln County, North Carolina
Buildings and structures in Lincoln County, North Carolina